Good Luck is a 2000 Indian Tamil-language romantic drama film written, directed and produced by Manoj Bhatnaghar. The movie stars Prashanth, Riya Sen and Raghuvaran in main roles. The film released on 4 February 2000.

Plot
Surya is a carefree Tamil youth living in Malaysia with his brother Chandramohan and sister-in-law Devi. Chandramohan and Devi are childless because of a problem with Chandramohan.  Surya falls in love with dancer Priya and manages to steal her heart too. Just when things seem happy, a bombshell is dropped by a Sister Mary who tells Surya that he is the father of a small girl Pooja. Pooja must undergo an operation to save her life but insists on seeing her dad before agreeing to the operation. Surya agrees to pose as her dad and is forced to do so on a more permanent basis even after the operation is done. He is driven out of the house and loses Priya, who agrees to wed an earlier suitor, Shyam. Person who happens to be the dad of Pooja's mother wants to kill Surya for cheating his daughter but ends up being arrested by police. Second half shifts to Cruise ship, where Chandramohan finds out that Pooja is actually his daughter. The film ends with Surya and Priya reuniting.

Cast
Prashanth as Surya
Riya Sen as Priya
Raghuvaran as Chandra Mohan
Sukanya as Devi
Vivek 
Vaiyapuri
Vinu Chakravarthy as Surya's uncle
Sindhu as Sangeetha Rajan
Sanjay Asrani as Shyam
Diyana
Pooja Sundharesh as Pooja
Pandu
Sabitha Anand as Sister Mary

Production
The film was initially set to feature Mayuri Kango as the lead heroine, but she was later replaced by Riya Sen. The entire film was shot in Thailand and Malaysia, while significant portions were shot on a cruise ship sponsored by Star Cruises.

Soundtrack

The film score and the soundtrack were composed by director Manoj Bhatnaagar himself and the lyrics were written by Vairamuthu. The soundtrack, released in December 1999, features 6 tracks with Keyaar and K. T. Kunjumon attending the audio launch function as chief guests.

Release
The film received mixed reviews from critics and did not fare well commercially at the box office. Despite the relative failure of the film, Manoj Bhatnagar announced his next film soon after, a collaboration with actor Madhavan, which then failed to take off.

References

External links
 

2000 films
2000s Tamil-language films
Indian drama films
Films shot in Malaysia
Films shot in Thailand